Viktoria Bengtsson (April 29, 1966 in Halmstad) is a Swedish rhythmic gymnast.

Bengtsson competed for Sweden in the rhythmic gymnastics individual all-around competition at the 1984 Summer Olympics in Los Angeles. There she was 20th in the preliminary (qualification) round and advanced to the final of 20 competitors. In the end she finished in the 19th place overall.

References

External links 
 Viktoria Bengtsson at Sports-Reference.com
 Viktoria Bengtsson at Olympic.org

1966 births
Living people
Swedish rhythmic gymnasts
Gymnasts at the 1984 Summer Olympics
Olympic gymnasts of Sweden
Sportspeople from Halmstad
Sportspeople from Halland County